The Havers was an automobile built in Port Huron, Michigan by the Havers Motor Car Company from 1911 until 1914. The company was established by brothers Fred and Ernest Havers in 1910, with the first cars being manufactured within the Port Huron Engine & Thresher Company's premises. In 1912 Havers bought the old E-M-F factory (also in Port Huron) and moved production there. The factory suffered a disastrous fire on 7 July 1914, destroying almost everything apart from the offices. While originally planning to resume production within a month, Havers were unable to sway their creditors who forced the company into bankruptcy.

The Havers were conventional in design, except they had a long chassis. All were equipped with L-head six-cylinder engines built by Continental, the 1914 engine being of 6.2 L capacity producing . The 1913 Model 6-55 Speed Car with two passengers sold for $2,250. In September 1913, the 1914 Havers Six-60 was introduced. It was largely unchanged from the preceding Six-55, aside from having a bored and stroked engine. The windshield and fenders were also redesigned, along with numerous other detail improvements.

Models

References

 

Defunct motor vehicle manufacturers of the United States
Motor vehicle manufacturers based in Michigan
St. Clair County, Michigan
1900s cars
1910s cars
Defunct manufacturing companies based in Michigan